A Madiba shirt is a loose-fitting silk shirt, usually adorned in a bright and colourful print. It became known in the 1990s, when Nelson Mandela—then elected President of South Africa—added the item to his regular attire. Mandela popularised this type of shirt, elevating the seemingly casual garment to formal situations.

Design
A form of casual wear, Madiba shirts are loose-fitting, usually worn without a necktie and untucked from trousers. It is adapted from Indonesian  clothing, and generally made of cotton or silk patterned with vivid colours. Mandela was said to prefer earthier tones for the shirt, though Madiba shirts with bright colors have endured in popularity.

History
Yusuf Surtee, a clothing-store owner who supplied Mandela with outfits for decades, said the Madiba design is based on Mandela's request for a shirt like Indonesian president Suharto's  attire. Fashion designer Desré Buirski presented this type of shirt (and her contact information) to Mandela as a gift on 7 May 1994 by getting it to a bodyguard during a visit to a Cape Town synagogue; Mandela wore the shirt to the dress rehearsal for his presidential inauguration. Sonwabile Ndamase said he "was the first to do it" in 1990.

The name "Madiba shirt" comes from Mandela's Xhosa clan name. The affectionate name became linked to the shirts when Mandela wore them to many business and political meetings during 1994–1999 and after his tenure as President of South Africa.

Legacy
Within the clothing industry, Mandela's willingness to wear the casual attire—he eventually owned dozens of the shirts—marked a new style of international business dress. In a broader sense, the fashion choice can be read as a signal of "friendly" regime change away from strict formality and toward greater acceptance. It can also be argued that, throughout his life, Mandela's fashion was a significant part of his public image: in the 1950s, he dressed in sophisticated clothes; during the Rivonia Trial in 1963–64, he brought out Xhosa traditions with a leopard-skin kaross; and after his release from prison, he wore the colourful Madiba shirt often. In 2013, art historian Lize van Robbroeck wrote: 

Madiba shirts (and variants) are popular among tourists to South Africa, South African sportspeople, and Tanzanian men (possibly as a sign of general African solidarity or reflecting Africa's supposedly more laid-back dress than Europe).

See also
Batik
Culture of Indonesia

References

Bibliography

 
 
 
 
 
 

South African fashion
African clothing
South African English
Nelson Mandela
Shirts